Vale Fertilizantes is a Brazilian fertilizer company, was founded in 2010 after the purchase of Fosfertil by the giant Vale.  The company made a profit of 114,000,000 reais in the first quarter of 2011.

The Mosaic Company completed the acquisition of Vale Fertilizantes in 2018

References

Vale S.A.
Companies based in Minas Gerais
Fertilizer companies of Brazil